The qualifying heats and the finals of the Men's 200 metres Freestyle event at the European LC Championships 1995 were held on Saturday 22 August 1995 in Vienna, Austria.

Finals

Qualifying heats

Remarks

See also
1993 Men's European Championships (LC) 200m Freestyle
1995 Men's World Championships (SC) 200m Freestyle
1996 Men's Olympic Games 200m Freestyle
1997 Men's European Championships (LC) 200m Freestyle

References
 scmsom results
 swimrankings
 swimmers-world

F